Events in the year 2004 in Turkey.

Incumbents
President: Ahmet Necdet Sezer
Prime Minister: Recep Tayyip Erdoğan

Deaths

January

February 
 February 1 - Suha Arın, film director, writer and producer (b. 1942)
 February 7 - Birol Pekel, footballer (b. 1938)
 February 8 - Cem Karaca, rock musician and Anatolian Rock legend (b. 1945)

March 
 March 18 - Yavuz Selekman,  wrestler and film actor (b. 1937)

April 
 April 10 - Sakıp Sabancı, businessman and philanthropist (b. 1933)
 April 18 - Gürdal Duyar, sculptor (b. 1935)
 April 21 - Rıza Doğan, Oliympic wrestler (b. 1931)
 April 24 - Feridun Karakaya, comedy actor (b. 1928)

May 
 May 18 - Çetin Alp, singer (b. 1947)
 May 29 - Kâni Karaca, religious singer (b. 1930)

June 
 June 6 - Necdet Mahfi Ayral, stage and cinema actor and director (b. 1908)
 June 13 - Doğan Acarbay, Olympic sprinter (b. 1927)
 June 15 - Ahmet Piriştina, politician (b. 1952)

July 
 July 14 - İsmail Hakkı Sunat, actor (b. 1966)
 July 20 - Kamuran Gürün, diplomat (b. 1924)
 July 26
 Oğuz Aral, cartoonist and comics artist (b. 1936)
 Kamran Usluer, actor (b. 1937)

August  
 August 15 - Semiha Berksoy, opera singer and painter (b. 1910)

September 
 September 23 – Bülent Oran screenwriter and actor (b. 1924)
 September 27 – Necdet Uğur politician (b. 1923)

October 
 October 7 – İsmet Ay, actor (b. 1924)
 October 18 – Pakize Tarzi, first female gynecologist in the Republic of Turkey (b. 1910)
 October 29 – Ordal Demokan, physicist (b. 1946)

November 
 November 9 – Mehmet Sabancı, businessman (b. 1963)
 November 10 – Şeref Görkey, footballer and manager (b. 1913)

December 
 December 4 – Mahmut Atalay, Olympic champion wrestler (b. 1934)
 December 30 – Rıza Maksut İşman, athlete (b. 1915)

See also
2004 in Turkish television

References

 
Years of the 21st century in Turkey
2000s in Turkey
Turkey
Turkey
Turkey